A digital ecosystem is a distributed, adaptive, open socio-technical system with properties of self-organization, scalability and sustainability inspired from natural ecosystems. Digital ecosystem models are informed by knowledge of natural ecosystems, especially for aspects related to competition and collaboration among diverse entities. The term is used in the computer industry, the entertainment industry, and the World Economic Forum.

History
The concept of Digital Business Ecosystem was put forward in 2002 by a group of European researchers and practitioners, including Francesco Nachira, Paolo Dini and Andrea Nicolai, who applied the general notion of digital ecosystems to model the process of adoption and development of ICT-based products and services in competitive, highly fragmented markets like the European one
. Elizabeth Chang, Ernesto Damiani and Tharam Dillon started in 2007 the IEEE Digital EcoSystems and Technologies Conference (IEEE DEST). Richard Chbeir, Youakim Badr, Dominique Laurent, and Hiroshi Ishikawa started in 2009 the ACM Conference on Management of Digital EcoSystems (MEDES)

Perspectives
The digital ecosystem metaphor and models have been applied to a number of business areas related to the production and distribution of knowledge-intensive products and services, including higher education. The perspective of this research is providing methods and tools to achieve a set of objectives of the ecosystem (e.g. sustainability, fairness, bounded information asymmetry, risk control and gracious failure). These objectives are seen as desirable properties whose emergence should be fostered by the digital ecosystem self-organization, rather than as explicit design goals like in conventional IT.

See also
 Oikos
 Ecology
 Ecosystem
 Information ecosystem
 Software ecosystem
 Platform ecosystem
 Knowledge commons
 Knowledge ecosystem
 Digital distribution
 Media ecology
 Social system

References

External links
 International ACM Conference on Management of Digital EcoSystems (MEDES) (since 2009) - computer science Conference for interdisciplinary studies on Digital Ecosystems and Analysis
 IEEE International Conference on Digital Ecosystems and Technologies (IEEE-DEST 2012) - computer science Conference for Digital Ecosystems and related Technologies. Held from 2007 to 2013.

Computing and society
Information systems
Conceptual systems
Social systems